María Eugenia Lorenzini Lorenzini (born 1959), better known as Kena Lorenzini, is a Chilean psychologist, photographer, writer, curator, feminist, and activist.

Early life and education
Kena Lorenzini was born in Talca in 1959 to a Catholic and Pinochetist family. She completed secondary school at the Liceo Blanco Encalada in Talca in 1976. She earned a degree in Gender and Sexualities, Research, and Social Intervention from the Academy of Christian Humanism University and a master's in clinical psychology with a mention in psychoanalysis from Adolfo Ibáñez University.

Career
Lorenzini made her debut as a self-taught photographer in 1980. She takes inspiration from urban art present in Chile from the 1970s, passing through the dictatorship of Augusto Pinochet into the reinterpretation of urban culture present in contemporary cities. Much of her photography has been devoted to documenting social protests.

Exhibitions
Lorenzini has participated in several solo and group exhibitions, including CowParade Santiago (2006), Chile, geografía de niños (2000), Visible/Invisible at La Moneda Palace (2009), Historia de Chile a través de la fotografía at the National Museum of Fine Arts (2010), and Fragmentos/Memorias/Imágenes a 40 años del golpe at the Museum of Memory and Human Rights (2013).

Politics
In the 2017 general election, Lorenzini stood as a Broad Front candidate for senator, receiving 4,836 votes (1.3% of the total cast). She is a member of Democratic Revolution and publicly advocates for women's rights, same-sex marriage, and LGBT rights.

Personal life
Lorenzini's left-wing politics and identification as a lesbian caused conflict with her family early in life. She abandoned Catholicism at age 23.

Works
 Fragmento fotográfico, arte, narración y memoria. Chile 1980–1990 (2006), 
 Marcas crónicas: fotografías de Kena Lorenzini (2010), 
 Parejas lésbicas: tramas del sufrimiento y emergencia de nuevos imaginarios en la subjetividad femenina (2010), 
 Diversidad sexual: 10 años de marchas en Chile (2011), 
 Todas íbamos a ser reinas: Michelle Bachelet (2011), 
 Visible/invisible: Hughes/Lorenzini/Vicuña: tres fotógrafas durante la dictadura militar. Ocho Libros (2012). Montserrat Rojas Corradi, Laura González, Mario Fonseca. .

Gallery

References

External links

 Official blog

1959 births
21st-century Chilean women writers
21st-century Chilean non-fiction writers
Academy of Christian Humanism University alumni
Chilean art curators
Chilean photographers
Chilean psychologists
Chilean women psychologists
Chilean women's rights activists
Democratic Revolution politicians
Lesbian artists
Lesbian feminists
Chilean LGBT rights activists
Chilean lesbian writers
Living people
People from Talca
Chilean feminist writers
LGBT psychologists